St. Paul the Apostle Church may refer to:

in Canada
St. Paul the Apostle Church (Toronto)

in the United States
(by state, then city)
St. Paul the Apostle Church and School in Los Angeles, California
St. Paul the Apostle Church (Calumet, Michigan), listed as a Michigan State Historic Site
St. Paul the Apostle Church (Manhattan), listed on the National Register of Historic Places
St. Paul the Apostle Church (Mechanicville, New York)